Rio Kevin Alderton is an English semi-professional footballer who plays as a midfielder. He played twice in the Football League with Southend United, before dropping into non-League football.

Career
Alderton started his career as a youth team player will Millwall, before joining Southend United in 2002. He made his debut for Southend on 13 April, in the Third Division 2–0 home defeat to Shrewsbury Town, replacing Ian Selley as a substitute in the 65th minute. He made his second and last appearance for Southend seven days later away at Macclesfield Town in the 0–0 draw, replacing Barrington Belgrave in the 72nd minute. He then dropped into non-League football joining Conference National club Gravesend & Northfleet in October 2002. In July 2003, Alderton moved to Chelmsford City, before taking a pay-cut to sign for Wivenhoe Town in December 2003. Later in the month, Alderton then signed for Aveley. Moves to Tilbury followed in October 2004, and Leyton in September 2005 – where he was made captain. Whilst at Leyton, Alderton had an unsuccessful trial spell with League One club, Brentford in October 2006. Alderton then signed for Redbridge two years later, when he was released by Leyton. He then played for Enfield Town, before signing initially on loan for Sittingbourne, making the move permanent in November 2008.

References

External links

1982 births
Living people
English footballers
English Football League players
National League (English football) players
Isthmian League players
Southend United F.C. players
Ebbsfleet United F.C. players
Chelmsford City F.C. players
Wivenhoe Town F.C. players
Aveley F.C. players
Tilbury F.C. players
Leyton F.C. players
Redbridge F.C. players
Enfield Town F.C. players
Sittingbourne F.C. players
Association football midfielders